Garrison Green is a residential neighbourhood in the southwest quadrant of Calgary, Alberta, Canada. It is located on former Canadian Forces Base (CFB) Calgary, bounded by Richardson Road SW to the west, Glenmore Trail (Highway 8) to the south, Crowchild Trail to the east, and the Lincoln Park community to the north. The neighbourhood is referred to as Lincoln Park South in the CFB West Master Plan and consists of the CFB Calgary's former Lincoln Park Permanent Marital Quarters (PMQ).

Garrison Green is located within Calgary City Council's Ward 11.

Demographics 

See also 
 List of neighbourhoods in Calgary

References 

Neighbourhoods in Calgary